The Speaker of the Illinois House of Representatives is seventh (behind the Lieutenant Governor, Attorney General, Secretary of State, Comptroller, Treasurer, and President of the Senate, respectively) in the line of succession to the office of Governor of Illinois.

List of speakers
This is a complete list of the Speakers of the Illinois House of Representatives . Each was chosen since the Illinois General Assembly's first session in 1818.

The colors indicate the political party affiliation of each speaker.

References

External links
 Illinois General Assembly - House official government site
 Illinois Blue Book 2009–10 official government document

House Speaker
Illinois